Brown's Creek CCC Camp Barracks in Weippe, Idaho was built in 1933 listed on the National Register of Historic Places in 1984.

It is a one-story frame building, "a standard-design Civilian Conservation Corps work center building."

After being relocated in 1947, it has served as Weippe Public Library. It now houses the Weippe Hilltop Heritage Museum.

References

National Register of Historic Places in Clearwater County, Idaho
Government buildings completed in 1933
Libraries on the National Register of Historic Places in Idaho
Civilian Conservation Corps in Idaho
1933 establishments in Idaho
Relocated buildings and structures in Idaho
History museums in Idaho